Charles Elbert Scoggins (1888-1955) was an American writer who specialized in adventure stories set in Central America.

Two of his stories were filmed by Hollywood; Untamed in 1929 and Tycoon, first serialized in the Saturday Evening Post in 1932 was filmed with John Wayne in 1947.

External links
C.E. Scoggins magazine stories https://web.archive.org/web/20081204124136/http://www.philsp.com/homeville/FMI/d1646.htm#A77321
C.E. Scoggins works in the Open Library https://openlibrary.org/a/OL2315333A/C._E._Scoggins

1888 births
1955 deaths
American short story writers
Pulp fiction writers
Place of birth missing